The Shove Memorial Chapel is a church located in downtown Colorado Springs, Colorado that was designed by John Grey and built from 1930 to 1931. The church has been on the National Register of Historic Places since May 22, 2005, and is of Norman Romanesque style.

John Grey, the architect, made a very comprehensive plan of the church, and hired various craftsmen from around the country to apply the detail he wanted. The church is made from Bedford limestone mined and cut in Indiana, and Robert Garrison designed gargoyles and exterior sculptures around the building. Robert E. Wade painted the ornate roof inside the chapel, and Joseph Reynolds Jr. designed the stained glass windows.

Despite being built in the middle of the Great Depression, it is widely considered to be one of the finest examples of Norman Romanesque architecture in the state of Colorado. The chapel is now located on the grounds of Colorado College.

On the master bell of the chapel, Westminster quarter chimes cast in Croydon, England, there is an engraving of a statement by poet Kahlil Gibran: "Yesterday is but today's memory, an tomorrow is today's dream."

See also 
 National Register of Historic Places listings in El Paso County, Colorado

References 

Churches completed in 1931
1931 establishments in Colorado
Churches in Colorado Springs, Colorado
Romanesque Revival church buildings in Colorado
Churches on the National Register of Historic Places in Colorado
National Register of Historic Places in Colorado Springs, Colorado